Pakotai is a locality in the Mangakahia River Valley of Northland, New Zealand. Kaikohe is about 37 km to the north, and Maungatapere is about 34 km to the south east.

Copper was mined at Pakotai from 1947 to 1951.

Marae
The village has two local marae affiliated with the Ngāpuhi hapū of Ngāti Horahia, Ngāti Moe, Ngāti Te Rino, Ngāti Toki, Te Kumutu, Ngāti Whakahotu and Te Parawhau: Te Oruoru Marae, and Te Tārai o Rāhiri Marae and Nukutawhiti meeting house.

Education
Pakotai School is a coeducational full primary (years 1–8) school with a decile rating of 2 and a roll of 24. The school was founded in 1905.

Notes

Whangarei District
Populated places in the Northland Region